Bonnell is an unincorporated community in Manchester Township, Dearborn County, Indiana.

History
The post office Bonnell once contained had the name Kennedy. It operated between 1885 and 1929.

Geography

References

Dearborn County Historical Society

Unincorporated communities in Dearborn County, Indiana
Unincorporated communities in Indiana